Jens Pauli Heinesen (2 November 1932 in Sandavágur − 19 July 2011 in Tórshavn) was a Faroese writer. He received the Faroese Literature Prize four times and the Faroese Cultural Prize once. From 1968 to 1975, Heinesen was president of the Association of Writers of the Faroe Islands (Rithøvundafelag Føroya). He wrote novels, short stories, poems, plays, a children's book and translated books from foreign languages into Faroese.

Biography 
Jens Pauli Heinesen's parents were Petur Heinesen á Lofti, a farmer from Sandavágur, and Anna Maria Malena Heinesen (born Johannesen) from the small island Hestur. He grew up in the village of Sandavágur. At 14 years old he moved to Tórshavn, where he worked briefly at an office and published his first book, Degningsælið, before finishing high school in 1954. After graduating, he moved to Denmark, where he studied at Emdrupborg Statsseminarium and became a school teacher in 1956.

In August of 1956, he married Maud Brimheim from Klaksvík. They had a daughter, Elin Brimheim Heinesen, in 1958, and later adopted a second daughter, Marianna, from Korea. The family moved back to the Faroe Islands in 1957. Maud Heinesen (born Brimheim) later became a writer of children's books.

Bibliography 
Jens Pauli Heinesen wrote with a colloquial rather than an academic tone, claiming that he had to write in his own dialect. His writings are characterized by thematizing the development of Faroese society to modernity, with a critical vision on his contemporary cultural climate. Additionally, he wrote partially autobiographical novels such as the seven-volume series Á ferð inn í eina óendaliga søgu (On a journey into a never ending story). He also composed the poem Eitt dýpi av dýrari tíð (An Abyss of Precious Time) which was accompanied with melodies by his daughter Ellin. The poem was released in 1988 and remains a popular song on the island.

Novels 
 Yrkjarin úr Selvík og vinir hansara, Tórshavn : Published by the author, 1958. – 211 pages. Second edition was published in 1981 by the Faroese Teachers' Association.
 Tú upphavsins heimur I, Tórshavn : Published by the author, 1962.
 Tú upphavsins heimur II, Tórsh. : Published by the author, 1964.
 Tú upphavsins heimur III, Tórsh. : Published by the author, 1966.
 Tú upphavsins heimur – 2nd edition (changed), Kollafjørður : Árting, 1990. – 320 pages
 Frænir eitur ormurin – Tórsh.: Published by the author, 1973. – 466 pages
 Rekamaðurin, Tórshavn – Gestur, 1977. – 117 pages 
 Tey telgja sær gudar – Tórshavn : Gestur, 1979. – 133 pages
 Nú ert tú mansbarn á foldum – Tórshavn : Gestur, 1980. – 162 pages, (Á ferð inn í eina óendaliga søgu ; 1) 
 Lýsir nú fyri tær heimurin – Tórshavn : Gestur, 1981. – 128 pages, (Á ferð inn í eina óendaliga søgu ; 2) 
 Leikur tín er sum hin ljósi dagur : novel, Tórshavn : Gestur, 1982. – 169 pages, (Á ferð inn í eina óendaliga søgu ; 3)
 Markleys breiðist nú fyri tær fold : novel, Tórshavn : Gestur, 1983. – 192 pages, (Á ferð inn í eina óendaliga søgu ; 4) 
 Eitt dýpi av dýrari tíð, Tórsh. : Gestur, 1984. – 131 pages (Á ferð inn í eina óendaliga søgu ; 5)
 Í andgletti – Tórsh. : Gestur, 1988. – 167 pages, (Á ferð inn í eina óendaliga søgu ; 6) 
 Bláfelli – Tórshavn : Gestur, 1992. – 246 pages, (Á ferð inn í eina óendaliga søgu ; 7)
 Ein ódeyðilig sál – og aðrar, Tórshavn : Mentunargrunnur Studentafelagsins, 1999. – 297 pages 
 Koparskrínið, Tórshavn : Mentunargrunnur Studentafelagsins, 2000. – 120 pages
 Hvør var Nimrod?, novel – Mentunargrunnur Studentafelagsins, 2004

Short stories 
 Degningsælið – Tórshavn : Blaðstarv, 1953. – 99 pages, 2nd edition in 1978 at the publishing house Gestur, 180 pages.
 Hin vakra kvirran – Tórshavn : [s. n.], 1958 [i.e. 1959]. – 164 pages 
 Gestur – Tórsh. : Eget forlag, 1967. – 103 pages
 Aldurnar spæla á sandi – Tórshavn : Eget forlag, 1969. – 152 pages
 Bølgerne leger på stranden, Danish translation, 1980.
 Í aldingarðinum – Tórsh. : Eget forlag, 1971. – 112 pages
 Gamansleikur : søgur úr Krabburð – Tórshavn : Eget forlag, 1974. – 151 pages 
 Dropar í lívsins havi : søgusavn – Tórshavn : Gestur, 1978. – 166 pages 
 Tann gátuføri kærleikin – Tvøroyri : Hestur, 1986. – 158 pages
 Gamansleikur 2 : søgur úr Krabburð – Tórshavn : Gestur, 1995. – 142 pages
 Rósa Maria : short stories – Tórshavn : Mentunargrunnur Studentafelagsins, 1995. – 175 pages

Plays 
 Uppi í eini eikilund – Tórshavn, 1970. – 49 pages 
 Hvønn stakkin skal eg fara í, pápi : play about Annika í Dímun – in three parts. Tórshavn, 1975, 74 pages
 Fýra sjónleikir (Four plays) – Tórshavn : Gestur, 1985. – 227 pp Includes these plays:
 Hvønn stakkin skal eg fara í, pápi – 1975
 Vælkomnir, føringar, her í vási – 1978
 Skuggarnir – 1979
 Uppi í eini eikilund – 1969
 Sníkurin : læran um sálina : sjónleikur (play) – Tórshavn, 1989. – 38 pages

Children's books 
 Brúsajøkul – Tórshavn: Føroya Lærarafelag, 1987. – 72  Translations 
 Eitt dukkuheim : play (in three episodes) / by Henrik Ibsen – Tórshavn : Jens Pauli Heinesen translated into Faroese, 1984, 83 pages. Original title: Et dukkehjemLeingi livi lítla tokið – children's book – written and illustrated by Charlotte Steiner ; Jens Pauli Heinesen translated into Faroese,
Tórshavn: Føroya Lærarafelag in co-operation with Illustrationsforlaget, [1958]. – 24 s. (Glæstribøkurnar ; 4)Knassi'', children's book by Sterling North ; Jens Pauli Heinesen translated into Faroese, Tórshavn: Føroya Lærarafelag, 2000. – 191 s. original title: Rascal.

Prizes 

Jens Pauli Heinesen has four times received the Faroese Literature Prize (Mentanarvirðisløn M. A. Jacobsens) and one time the Faroese Cultural Prize (Mentanarvirðisløn Landsins).

 1959 – Faroese Literature Prize
 1969 – Faroese Literature Prize for the novel: Aldurnar spæla á sandi
 1973 – Faroese Literature Prize for the series of novels: Frænir eitur ormurin
 1993 – Faroese Literature Prize for the novel: Bláfelli og raðið (Á ferð inn í eina óendaliga søgu).
 1999 – Mentanarvirðisløn Landsins (150.000 DKK)

References 

Faroese male novelists
Faroese writers
Faroese children's writers
Faroese short story writers
Faroese male poets
1932 births
Faroese Literature Prize recipients
2011 deaths
Faroese-language poets
20th-century Faroese poets
20th-century Danish novelists
20th-century Danish short story writers
Danish male short story writers
20th-century Danish male writers